Michael Salinger (born March 2, 1962) is an American poet, performer, and educator living in Northeast Ohio. He is one of the earliest participants in the National Poetry Slam, former board member oforganization's summer writing and performance conference. He is the author of teacher professional books and a frequent speaker at teacher conferences and in schools in the US and abroad where he uses performance poetry as a means to better literacy and comprehension skills.

Salinger was a member or coach of the team representing Cleveland, Ohio at the National Poetry Slam a dozen times - making two finals stage appearances. He also emceed the individual finals competition of the National Poetry Slam on several occasions.

He is the founding director of Poetry Slam Inc.'s Poetry Cross-training Conference - a writing and performance seminar held on the campus of SUNY Oneonta the last week of June.

Salinger is the founding instructor of the Slam U program of the Playhouse Square Foundation in Cleveland Ohio, the second largest performing arts institution after Broadway. Here students learn writing and performance skills and have the opportunity to represent the city at Brave New Voices, the youth national poetry slam.

Salinger began performing his poetry in the mid 1980s in and around Cleveland Ohio at venues such as the Pearl Road Auto Wrecking Junkstock festivals, created by Daniel Thompson, and Macs Backs paperbacks in the eclectic Coventry neighborhood.
He gravitated into the poetry slam scene by default as it was just starting to take hold.  His stage appearances became more elaborate taking cues from the Dada movement and eventually began involving a cast of characters and makeshift scripts and stage directions resulting in the performance art troupe The Nova Lizard Project during the late 1980s and early 1990s. During this time he married and had two children.

Publications

Poetry collections
Big Machines and Wheeled Things - 1986 Burning Press
RiZZ – 1989 Burning Press
The One That Got Away – 1994 Wee Albert Press
Sunday Morning – 1999 – Burning Press
Neon – 2002 – Bottom Dog Press ( BGSU Firelands)
They Call it Fishing Not Catching – 2004 – Wordsmith Press
Stingray - 2007 - Wordsmith Press
Well Defined - Vocabulary in Rhyme - Spring of 2009 - Boyd's Mills Press (Illustrated by Sam Henderson)
 A Bear in the Kitchen - 2013 - Red Giant Books

Professional books
Outspoken: How to Improve Writing and Speaking Skills Through Poetry Performance - 2006 - Heinemann
High Definition: Unforgettable Vocabulary-Building Strategies Across Genres and Subjects - 2010 - Heinemann
 High Impact Writing Clinics - 2013 - Corwin Literacy
From Striving to Thriving Writers: Strategies to Jump Start Writing - 2018 - Scholastic

Personal life
He currently lives in Ohio with children’s author Sara Holbrook.

References
ABOUT:  Piñero & the Poet’s Life
Michigan Daily  Slam Attracts Local and National Talent
Magaera Magazine  Chatting with Michael Salinger
Cleveland Museum of Art Education and Research  Michael Salinger, Curriculum Advisor
American Journalism Review  Ode to the Alternative Press
Cleveland Free Times  The Color of Spit
Indie Feed Performer Profile
Cleveland Poetry Slam Teams Cleveland Slam Teams

External links
outspokenlit.com
michaelsalinger.com
Heinemann Author's page
poetryslam.com
PSi Poetry Cross Training Conference
Playhouse Square Foundation
Vincent Brother's Review
Corwin author page

American male poets
Living people
1962 births
21st-century American poets
21st-century American male writers